The 2015 Balearic Island Council elections were held on Sunday, 24 May 2015, to elect the 10th Island Councils of Mallorca and Menorca and the 3rd Island Councils of Formentera and Ibiza. All 76 seats in the four Island Councils were up for election. The elections were held simultaneously with regional elections in thirteen autonomous communities and local elections all throughout Spain.

Opinion polls

Island Council control
The following table lists party control in the Island Councils. Gains for a party are displayed with the cell's background shaded in that party's colour.

Islands

Formentera

Ibiza

Mallorca

Menorca

See also
2015 Balearic regional election
Results breakdown of the 2015 Spanish local elections (Balearic Islands)

References

Balearic
2015
May 2015 events in Spain